The Estadio Cementos Progreso is a multi-use stadium in Guatemala City. It is also known popularly as  Estadio La Pedrera in reference to its location in the neighborhood of the same name in the Zone 6 of the Guatemalan capital. It was built in 1991 and is named after Cementos Progreso, a local cement manufacturer.

Inaugurated on 10 November 1991, the stadium is used mostly for football (soccer) matches, it has hosted international home matches of the Guatemala national football team, and it is the home venue of Comunicaciones reserve team, Comunicaciones B and Aurora. It has a capacity of 14,022 seats, being the second-largest stadium in Guatemala after the Estadio Doroteo Guamuch Flores.

Originally of natural grass, its field was changed to artificial turf in 2010. It is surrounded by a tartan athletic track, the first ever installed in the country, which complies with IAAF regulations.

References

External links
 Official website

1991 establishments in Guatemala
Cementos Progreso
Cementos Progreso
Sports venues completed in 1991